Music Box Opera is the thirteenth studio album by Canadian new age/electronic music group Delerium, released in 2012.

"Monarch", "Days Turn into Nights", and "Chrysalis Heart" have accompanying music videos.

Track listing

References

2012 albums
Delerium albums
Nettwerk Records albums